The 2019–20 Burkinabé Premier League was the 58th edition of the Burkinabé Premier League, the top-tier football league in Burkina Faso, since its establishment in 1961. It began on 31 August 2018, but was cancelled on 4 May 2019 due to the global COVID-19 pandemic after 24 of the 30 matches had been played. No champion was declared. Salitas FC was leading the league at the time of the cancellation. No teams were relegated, but two teams, Vitesse FC and Léopards de St. Camille, were promoted from the second-tier Burkinabé Deuxième Division into the Premier League for the next season, as their season had already concluded by the time of cancellation.

League table

Stadiums

Top scorers

References

Premier League
Premier League
Burkina Faso
Burkinabé Premier League seasons